There were 29 athletes on wheelchairs and 48 athletes on foot representing the country at the 2000 Summer Paralympics.

Medal table

See also
Mexico at the 2000 Summer Olympics
Mexico at the Paralympics

References

Bibliography

External links
International Paralympic Committee

Nations at the 2000 Summer Paralympics
Paralympics
2000